Hopkins House is a historic home located at Lockport in Niagara County, New York.  It is a two-story stone structure built in 1833 by John Hopkins, an Erie Canal engineer and early settler of Lockport, in the Greek Revival style. It was remodeled in about 1865 adding Italianate details. It is one of approximately 75 stone residences remaining in the city of Lockport.

It was listed on the National Register of Historic Places in 2003.

References

External links
Hopkins House - Lockport, NY - U.S. National Register of Historic Places on Waymarking.com

Houses on the National Register of Historic Places in New York (state)
Houses completed in 1833
Greek Revival houses in New York (state)
Houses in Niagara County, New York
National Register of Historic Places in Niagara County, New York